Adélie Land is a claimed territory on the continent of Antarctica. It stretches from a portion of the Southern Ocean coastline all the way inland to the South Pole. France has administered it as one of five districts of the French Southern and Antarctic Lands since 1955 and applied the Antarctic Treaty System rules since 1961. Article 4 deals with territorial claims, and although it does not renounce or diminish any preexisting claims to sovereignty, it also does not prejudice the position of Contracting Parties in their recognition or non-recognition of territorial sovereignty. France has had a permanent station in Adélie Land since April 9, 1950. The current Dumont d'Urville Station has a winter population around 25, but this goes up to about 78 during the Antarctic summer. A species of penguin, the Adélie penguin, is named after it.

Geography 

Adélie Land has borders with the Australian Antarctic Territory both on the east and on the west, namely on Clarie Land (part of Wilkes Land) in the west, and George V Land in the east. Its total land area, mostly covered with glaciers, is estimated to be .

History 
The coast of Adélie Land was discovered in January 1840 by the French explorer Jules Dumont d'Urville (1790–1842) who named it after his wife, Adèle. This is the basis of the French claim to this Antarctic land.

Image Gallery

Research stations

Dumont d'Urville Station

Port Martin
Port Martin housed a winter population of 11 in 1950–51 and 17 in 1951–52.

Charcot Station
The station, built for the International Geophysical Year of 1957–58, paid homage to Jean-Baptiste Charcot), and was occupied from January 1957 through 1960 housing alone three men.

The base was composed of a main body of 24 square metres (the "barrack") which consisted of semicylindrical sections of sheet metal assembled end to end. This form was planned to  best withstand the snow pressure accumulated on it. Horizontal galleries were connected to house scientific measurement devices, while a vertical air conduit opened a few metres above the snow level provided ventilation.

Cap Prud'Homme Camp
All the supplies and equipment for the Italian-French Concordia Station are transported by a combined convoy of up to 7 Caterpillar tractors from Cap Prud'Homme, with Kässbohrer trailblazers and a team of up to 9 people; each convoy transports an average of 150 tons of payload.

In popular culture

 The Dumont d'Urville research station was the filming location of the documentary March of the Penguins (2005).

See also
 Adelie Land Meteorite
 Adélie Valley
 Research stations in Antarctica
 Antarctic field camps

References

External links 
 Discover France - French Colonies - TERRE ADÉLIE

 
France and the Antarctic
French Southern and Antarctic Lands
Regions of Antarctica
Lands of Antarctica
Territorial claims in Antarctica
Geography of the French Southern and Antarctic Lands